Singing River is a 1921 American silent Western film directed by Charles Giblyn and starring William Russell, Vola Vale and Clark Comstock.

Cast
 William Russell as Long Rush
 Vola Vale as Alice Thornton
 Clark Comstock as John Thornton
 Jack Roseleigh as Lew Bransom
 Arthur Morrison as Sam Hemp
 Jack McDonald as Bert Condon
 Jack Hull as Freud
 Louis King asKane
 Charles King as Grimes

References

Bibliography
 Solomon, Aubrey. The Fox Film Corporation, 1915-1935: A History and Filmography. McFarland, 2011.

External links
 

1921 films
1921 Western (genre) films
American black-and-white films
Films directed by Charles Giblyn
Fox Film films
Silent American Western (genre) films
1920s English-language films
1920s American films